Jack Chambers (born 21 November 1990) is an Irish Fianna Fáil politician who has served as a Minister of State attending cabinet since July 2020, and served as Government Chief Whip from July 2020 to December 2022. He has been a Minister of State at various departments since June 2020. He has been a Teachta Dála (TD) for the Dublin West constituency since the 2016 general election.

Early and personal life
Chambers was born in Galway in 1990, but has lived in Dublin since early childhood. He resides in the Castleknock area of west Dublin. His father, Frank Chambers, from Newport, County Mayo, is a consultant at the Mater Private Hospital, and was a political ally of Brian Lenihan Jnr. His mother, Barbara Farragher, is from Hollymount, County Mayo. He is not related to the senator Lisa Chambers. He attended Belvedere College and earned a Law and Political Science degree from Trinity College Dublin, before enrolling in medicine at RCSI, graduating in 2020 after interrupting his studies early in his political career.

Political career
In 2014, Chambers reopened the constituency office closed after the death of Brian Lenihan in 2011. He was elected to Fingal County Council in the 2014 local elections, topping the poll in the Castleknock local electoral area. He was Deputy Mayor of Fingal from 2015 until vacating his council seat on election to the Dáil.

In March 2018, Micheál Martin appointed Chambers as Spokesperson for Defence. On 3 May 2018, he, along with several other Fianna Fáil TDs, called for a No vote in the referendum to remove the constitutional article which prohibited abortion by recognising the equal right to life of the unborn. He has since stated that his position has evolved and that he supports women being able to access terminations up to 12 weeks of pregnancy in all circumstances. At the 2020 general election, he was re-elected as a TD for Dublin West.

When Martin became Taoiseach, he nominated Chambers as Minister of State at the Department of Finance on 1 July 2020. Two weeks later, after Barry Cowen was sacked as Minister for Agriculture, Food and the Marine, Martin promoted Dara Calleary to replace Cowen, with Chambers succeeding Calleary as Government Chief Whip and Minister of State for Sport and the Gaeltacht. Chambers said he would take an "intensive Irish language course" to prepare for the latter responsibility, as he does not speak Irish fluently. On 17 November 2020, Chambers was appointed to the additional post of Minister of State at the Department of Defence.

In December 2022, after Leo Varadkar became Taoiseach, Chambers was reassigned as Minister of State at the Department of Transport with special responsibility for International and Road Transport and Logistics and Minister of State at the Department of the Environment, Climate and Communications with special responsibility for Postal Policy.

References

External links

Jack Chambers' page on the Fianna Fáil website

 

1990 births
Living people
Alumni of Trinity College Dublin
Fianna Fáil TDs
Local councillors in Fingal
Members of the 32nd Dáil
Members of the 33rd Dáil
People educated at Belvedere College
People from Castleknock
Politicians from Fingal
Ministers of State of the 33rd Dáil
Alumni of the Royal College of Surgeons in Ireland
Government Chief Whip (Ireland)